Gymnopogon ambiguus, commonly called bearded skeletongrass, is a species of grass that is native to southeastern North America.

References

Flora of North America
Chloridoideae